Robert, Rob, or Bob Edwards may refer to:

Sport 
 Rob Edwards (footballer, born 1970), English footballer formerly of Huddersfield Town
 Rob Edwards (footballer, born 1973), Wales international footballer who played for Carlisle, Bristol City, Preston, Blackpool and Exeter
 Robert Edwards (gridiron football) (born 1974), American football player for the New England Patriots and Toronto Argonauts
 Rob Edwards (footballer, born 1982), Wales international footballer who played for Aston Villa, Wolves, Blackpool and Barnsley
 Bobby Edwards (soccer) (born 1995), American soccer player
 Rob Edwards (basketball) (born 1997), American basketball player

Entertainment, journalism, and broadcasting 
 Bob Edwards (satirist) (1860–1922), Canadian founder of the Calgary Eye Opener weekly newspaper
 Robert Edwards (artist) (1879–1948), American illustrator, musician, and writer
 Bob Edwards (British journalist) (1925–2012), British journalist
 Bobby Edwards (1926–2012), American country musician
 Bob Edwards (born 1947), American radio broadcaster
 Rob Edwards (actor) (born 1949), British actor
 Rob Edwards (screenwriter) (born 1963), American screenwriter

Academia 
 Robert Dudley Edwards (1909–1988), Irish historian
 Sir Robert Edwards (physiologist) (1925–2013), British scientist, IVF pioneer, and Nobel Laureate in Physiology
 Robert Edmund Edwards (1926–2000), Australian mathematician, usually cited simply as R. E. Edwards
 Robert H. Edwards (born 1935), American president of Carleton College and Bowdoin College

Politics 
 Bob Edwards (politician) (1905–1990), British trade unionist and member of Parliament for Bilston and Wolverhampton South East
 F. Robert Edwards (born 1940), member of the Michigan House of Representatives

Others 
 Robert Edwards (pirate) (died 1762), Welsh buccaneer, former landowner of 77 acres of Manhattan real estate bequeathed in 1778
 Rob Edwards, African-American man lynched during the 1912 racial conflict in Forsyth County, Georgia
 Robert Mark Edwards (born 1961), American murderer

See also
Bert Edwards (disambiguation)